Chester Leonard Lenny Gault (August 16, 1942 - April 21, 2012) is an American country music singer. He released at least five singles, three of which charted. In 1993, he was reported to be serving as a pastor in Blandburg, Pennsylvania. He died of cancer on April 21, 2012.

Discography

Singles

References

American country singer-songwriters
American male singer-songwriters
2012 deaths
1942 births
Singer-songwriters from Oregon
Country musicians from Oregon